William Chapman Revercomb (July 20, 1895 – October 6, 1979) was an American politician and lawyer. A Republican, he served two separate terms in the United States Senate representing the state of West Virginia.

Life and career
Revercomb was born in Covington, Virginia, the son of Elizabeth Forrer (Chapman) and George Anderson Revercomb. He attended Washington and Lee University before entering the United States Army in World War I where he served as a corporal. Returning from the war, he transferred to the law school at the University of Virginia, graduating in 1919. He practiced law in Covington for few years before moving to Charleston, West Virginia in 1922.

He was elected to the Senate in 1942. There he championed opposition to the foreign and domestic policies of the administration of Harry S. Truman and was a stalwart supporter of civil rights. In 1945, Revercomb was among the seven senators who opposed full United States entry into the United Nations. Revercomb was defeated for re-election in 1948 and for the state's other Senate seat in 1952. In both races, his support of the national Republican party's civil rights policies were major issues.

In 1956, he won a special election to fill the vacancy caused by the death of Harley M. Kilgore, his Democratic opponent in the 1952 election. He re-entered the Senate and served through the end of 1958. During his second tenure in the Senate, Revercomb voted in favor of the Civil Rights Act of 1957.

In 1958, he lost to Congressman Robert Byrd in his re-election bid in another racially charged election (Byrd held the seat until his death in 2010, becoming the first U.S. senator to serve uninterrupted for more than 50 years). He then lost the Republican nomination for governor in 1960 and retired from politics. He practiced law in Charleston until his death in 1979.

Revercomb was the last Republican to represent West Virginia in the Senate (his 1956–59 term) until the election of Shelley Moore Capito in 2014 ended a 56 year streak of Democratic Senate victories in the state.

References

External links 
West Virginia & Regional History Center at West Virginia University, Chapman Revercomb, Politician, Biography
 Retrieved on 2009-5-18

1895 births
1979 deaths
Candidates in the 1944 United States presidential election
United States Army personnel of World War I
United States Army non-commissioned officers
American Presbyterians
West Virginia lawyers
West Virginia Republicans
Republican Party United States senators from West Virginia
People from Covington, Virginia
20th-century American politicians
20th-century American lawyers
Lawyers from Charleston, West Virginia
Politicians from Charleston, West Virginia
Washington and Lee University alumni
Military personnel from Virginia